Jesse Ekene Iwuji  (born August 12, 1987) is an American professional stock car racing driver and officer in the United States Navy Reserve. He competes part-time in the NASCAR Xfinity Series, driving the No. 34 Chevrolet Camaro for Jesse Iwuji Motorsports. He has also competed in the NASCAR Camping World Truck Series. NASCAR K&N Pro Series East, and West, and ARCA Racing Series in the past.

Iwuji attended the United States Naval Academy, where he joined the school's college football and track and field teams; on the former, he was a free safety for the Navy Midshipmen. He graduated from the academy in 2010 and entered the United States Navy as a surface warfare officer, in which he served on the Mine Countermeasures ship Exultant and USS Comstock. After seven years on active duty, Iwuji transitioned to the Navy Reserve.

As a sailor and driver, Iwuji has served as an ambassador for both the military and NASCAR communities. In addition to supporting military philanthropic groups, he is also involved in various NASCAR events supporting the armed forces and veterans.

Early life and military career
Iwuji attended Hebron High School, where he was a letterman twice in football and three times in track. On the football team, he was a two-star recruit. During his junior year of high school, Iwuji was contacted by the Naval Academy and was offered a scholarship to the school. In addition to continuing his football career at Hebron (where he was named first-team all-district in his senior year), he attended the Naval Academy Preparatory School before heading to the Naval Academy. He formally enrolled at the Academy on June 30, 2005.

Although he played linebacker in high school, he was a free safety on the Navy football team. He played on special teams during his freshman year in 2006 before starting two games at safety in 2007, but missed six games during the latter due to ankle injury. In 2008, he played in the Army–Navy Game and the EagleBank Bowl. Iwuji was a backup to Kwesi Mitchell in 2009, though he saw action at strong safety in the season opener against the Ohio State Buckeyes due to Emmett Merchant's injury. Iwuji also competed on the track and field team, where he ran the 60-meter, 100-meter, and 200-meter dashes in addition to the 4 × 100-meter relay.

Iwuji graduated in 2010 as a Bachelor of Science and became a surface warfare officer. After working as a football coach at the Naval Academy Preparatory School, he entered active service. Iwuji worked in mine countermeasures with Mine Countermeasures Crew Exultant and was deployed to Bahrain in 2012. He was later deployed on the USS Comstock, a ship whose name would later appear on a NASCAR Xfinity Series car when it was featured on Darrell Wallace Jr.'s No. 6 Ford Mustang in 2016. In May 2017, he moved to the Navy Reserve. He is currently stationed in Ventura, California.

Racing career

Early career
While attending the Naval Academy, Iwuji first expressed interest in motorsports when the Midshipmen visited the Lowe's Motor Speedway in Charlotte, North Carolina before the 2006 Meineke Car Care Bowl, during which the players rode around the track. During his senior year, he started drag racing at Capitol Speedway in Crofton, Maryland, driving a Chrysler 300. After his graduation, he raced a Dodge Challenger. Four years later, he participated in the Mojave Mile speed trial; for the event, he upgraded his Challenger's engine to a horsepower of 1,100. Afterwards, he joined the Naval Postgraduate School staff in southern California, where he was involved in road racing – driving a Chevrolet Corvette – before making the transition to stock cars.

NASCAR and ARCA

In 2014, Iwuji tested a stock car for Performance P-1 Motorsports at Irwindale Speedway. A year later, he began racing for the team after returning from deployment in the Persian Gulf. He first competed in the Whelen All-American Series, finishing 15th in his debut. He also made two NASCAR K&N Pro Series West starts that year at Evergreen Speedway, but did not start the race. He later ran the race at Meridian Speedway, finishing 23rd after a crash. In the winter, he ran 34 dirt track races, one of which included a fifth-place finish in a Winged 500cc Outlaw Kart A-main.

Iwuji started competing full-time in the K&N Pro Series West in 2016, driving the No. 36 for Patriot Motorsports Group. That year, he was named to the "Mighty 25: Veterans poised for impact in 2016" list by military website We Are The Mighty. He recorded a best finish of tenth at Orange Show Speedway. At the Utah Motorsports Campus race, he earned the Move of the Race Award, which is given to the driver who gains the most positions in a race. During the year, he also competed in the NAPA Big 5 Late Model Series at Meridian Speedway. Iwuji battled with Todd Gilliland and Salvatore Iovino for the K&N Pro Series West's 2016 Most Popular Driver Award, but lost to Iovino. He finished the season tenth in the final point standings and sixth the rookie standings. In February 2017, Iwuji was awarded the NASCAR Diverse Driver Award, which is given to a minority/female driver who "exemplifies outstanding performance both on and off the race track in encouraging awareness and interaction with NASCAR and motorsports".

Prior to the 2017 season, Iwuji became Patriot Motorsports Group's primary owner, while former National Football League linebacker Shawne Merriman partnered with the team to serve as owner of the No. 36 car. The two met during a fashion show in Los Angeles promoting Merriman's new clothing line; Merriman, a longtime motorsports fan, agreed to join PMG. Over the course of the season, Iwuji continued to race Outlaw Karts to develop his racing ability on both dirt and asphalt. In February, he ran his first NASCAR K&N Pro Series East race in the season opener at New Smyrna Speedway, in which he finished 21st.

In February 2018, Iwuji tested an ARCA Racing Series car for PMG at Daytona International Speedway in preparation for his series debut in the Lucas Oil 200. For the 2018 season, he intends to focus on competing in ARCA, particularly the larger tracks, in addition to running sporadic K&N East and West races. In August, Reaume Brothers Racing announced Iwuji would make his NASCAR Camping World Truck Series debut at Canadian Tire Motorsports Park in the team's No. 34 Chevrolet Silverado. After starting 31st, he finished 25th.

Iwuji returned to Reaume Brothers Racing and the Truck Series in 2019, driving the No. 34 at Las Vegas Motor Speedway. He returned to the Reaume team and the Truck Series for the third year in a row in 2020. He made starts at Charlotte Motor Speedway and Pocono Raceway, finishing 39th and 28th, respectively, both of which came in the team's No. 33.

In August 2020, he made his NASCAR Xfinity Series debut in the MBM Motorsports No. 13 Toyota at Road America. Later in the year, he joined B. J. McLeod Motorsports for three of the final four Xfinity races of the season.

Iwuji returned to RBR in 2021 for his fourth part-time season with the team. Driving the No. 34, he attempted to qualify for the season-opener at Daytona for the first time but failed to make the race. He then drove the No. 33 at Las Vegas. Iwuji would manage to get a one-off Xfinity start driving the #74 car from Mike Harmon Racing , after the driver for the #74, Bayley Currey, had to be replaced unexpectedly. Mike Harmon Racing would put out a statement on social media, saying "This decision was made as a TEAM in which Bayley FULLY supports. He is still the primary driver for the 74, we have no intentions of change that, he is a huge part of this team." With sponsorship from racing app Gap 'Em, Iwuji would be able to wheel the car into a 31st place finish.

In August 2021, Iwuji announced that he was partnering with Pro Football Hall of Famer Emmitt Smith to start an Xfinity Series team for the 2022 season, Jesse Iwuji Motorsports.

Personal life
Iwuji is of Igbo descent, an ethnic group of people in Nigeria. His parents, Sebastian and Enderline, immigrated to the United States in the 1980s. Enderline was a track runner in Nigeria, while daughter Emenderlyn ran track for Arkansas State. Like Iwuji, younger brothers Justin and Bryan played football, though at Texas State as a safety and linebacker, respectively; Justin had also been recruited to play quarterback for the Naval Academy Preparatory School before electing to attend Texas State. While Iwuji and his siblings are born in the United States, they hold Nigerian citizenship. As of 2017, Iwuji is one of three African-American drivers actively competing in a NASCAR series along with Wallace and Pro Series East driver Jay Beasley.

He is involved in various philanthropic and military-related activities. Iwuji is the racing ambassador for the Phoenix Patriot Foundation, a group formed after the September 11 attacks to support wounded soldiers. "We dedicate each race weekend to a wounded veteran and his family," Iwuji stated. "The effort has been widely supported by race officials and others. It's an opportunity for everyone to give back to the people who've made a sacrifice on their behalf." In March 2016, he drove Darrian Nordstrom, a four-year-old boy with terminal cancer, in a two-seat stock car. In May, he served as a host for a veteran's family prior to the Coca-Cola 600; as part of the NASCAR Salutes program, which honors United States military personnel, he was a guest co-host of NASCAR.com's GarageCam series.

Motorsports career results

NASCAR
(key) (Bold – Pole position awarded by qualifying time. Italics – Pole position earned by points standings or practice time. * – Most laps led.)

Xfinity Series

Camping World Truck Series

K&N Pro Series East

K&N Pro Series West

ARCA Racing Series
(key) (Bold – Pole position awarded by qualifying time. Italics – Pole position earned by points standings or practice time. * – Most laps led.)

 Season still in progress 
 Ineligible for series points

References

External links
 
 

1987 births
Living people
People from Carrollton, Texas
American people of Igbo descent
Igbo sportspeople
American sportspeople of Nigerian descent
Players of American football from Texas
American football safeties
Navy Midshipmen football players
21st-century American naval officers
ARCA Menards Series drivers
NASCAR drivers
NASCAR team owners
Racing drivers from Dallas
Racing drivers from Texas
United States Navy reservists
United States Naval Academy alumni
African-American racing drivers
21st-century African-American sportspeople
20th-century African-American people
Military personnel from Texas